Shaama Sandooyea (born 7 January 1997) is a Mauritian badminton player, a climate activist and a marine biologist. Sandooyea competed at the 2014 African Youth Games, and won a silver and a bronze medal in the girls' doubles and singles respectively. She also helped the team claim the bronze medal. In March 2021, while in a research mission with Greenpeace, she was part of the first underwater protest of the global climate strike.

Achievements

African Youth Games 
Girls' singles

Girls' doubles

BWF International Challenge/Series 
Women's doubles

  BWF International Challenge tournament
  BWF International Series tournament
  BWF Future Series tournament

References

External links 
 

1997 births
Living people
Mauritian female badminton players